EFB may refer to:

Science and technology
 Anisogramma anomala, a plant pathogen affecting Corylus spp. (hazelnut)
 Electronic flight bag, an information management device for flight crews
 European foulbrood, a honeybee disease
 Enhanced flooded battery, an automobile battery technology

Organisations
 European Federation of Biotechnology
 French Bilingual School of South Carolina, US

Sport
 Esbjerg fB, a Danish football club
 EfB Ishockey, a Danish professional ice hockey team